Herb Tam (born in Hong Kong) is the curator and director of exhibitions at the Museum of Chinese in America located in Manhattan's Chinatown.

Education and early career
Tam was born in Hong Kong and raised in the San Francisco Bay Area. He attended San Jose State University and has an MFA in Fine Arts from New York City's School of Visual Arts.

Prior to MOCA, he was an independent curator of contemporary art working in New York City with institutions such as the Queens Museum of Art, Exit Art, the Asia Society, Creative Capital Foundation and the New York Foundation for the Arts.

References

External links
Mindspray, Tam's journal-blog
2012 interview on Huffington Post

Hong Kong people
Living people
American art curators
Directors of museums in the United States
San Jose State University alumni
School of Visual Arts alumni
Chinese-American culture in New York City
Year of birth missing (living people)